Liebler is a surname. Notable people with the surname include:

M.L. Liebler (born 1953), American author and editor 
Scott Liebler (1959–1989), American racing driver

See also
Leibler (disambiguation)

Surnames of German origin